Quagliuzzo is a comune (municipality) in the Metropolitan City of Turin in the northern Italian region Piedmont, located about  north of Turin.

References

Cities and towns in Piedmont